The 2022 Kerry Senior Football Championship was the 121st edition of Kerry GAA's premier Gaelic football tournament for senior teams in County Kerry, Ireland. The tournament consists of 16 teams (8 club teams and 8 divisional teams), with the winners representing Kerry in the Munster Senior Club Football Championship if they are a club team. If the winners are a divisional team the winners of the Kerry Club Football Championship represent the county.

Format structure change
Eight club teams and eight divisional teams (16 in total) will take part in the 2022 S.F.C.

The 16 teams are divided into four mini-leagues of four teams. Each team plays three matches and the top two teams will progress to the quarterfinals

Kenmare District did not field a team for this S.F.C.

Relegation (See below): The club team to be relegated from the Senior County Championship will be the same team to be relegated from the Senior Club Championship (The 8 senior clubs play off against each other in two pools in the Club Championship. The two teams that finished bottom of the Group Pools enter a Relegation Final. This loser will be relegated to the I.F.C. for 2023. Should a club reach the final of the County championship they will be exempt from the Relegation process in the Club championship).

The winner of the 2022 I.F.C. will be promoted to the 2023 Senior County and Club Championships.

Team changes
The following teams have changed division since the 2021 championship season.

To Championship
Promoted from the Kerry Intermediate Football Championship
 Na Gaeil

From Championship
Relegated to the Kerry Intermediate Football Championship
 Legion

Participating teams
The teams taking part in the 2022 Kerry Senior Football Championship are:

2022 Teams

Results

Round 1

All 16 teams enter the competition in Round 1 with four groups of four teams playing each other once. The top two teams in each group proceed to the Quarter-Finals while the bottom two teams are eliminated.

Group 1 

Round 1

Round 2

Round 3

Group 2 

Round 1

Round 2

Round 3

Group 3 

Round 1

Round 2

Round 3

Group 4 

Round 1

Round 2

Round 3

Quarter-finals

Semi-finals

Final

Relegation play-off 

The club team to be relegated from the Senior County Championship will be the same team to be relegated from the Senior Club Championship. The 8 senior clubs are placed into two groups containing four teams during the Club Championship. The teams to finish bottom of both groups will face off in the Relegation Final, with the loser being relegated to the I.F.C. for 2023. Should a club reach the final of the County championship they will be exempt from the Relegation process in the Club championship.

Championship statistics

Top scorers

Overall

In a single game

Miscellaneous

 Na Gaeil make their first appearance at senior level.
 Dingle get their first win over Dr. Croke's in the SFC.
 Austin Stacks are relegated for the first time in their history.<ref>https://www.kerrygaa.ie/austin-stacks-relegated-to-intermediate-after-loss-to-kenmare/<\ref>
 Austin Stacks become the first club to relegated to the Intermediate championship after winning the senior title in the previous season.

References

Kerry Senior Football Championship
Kerry Senior Football Championship
Kerry SFC